O. P. Ralhan (21 August 1928 – 20 April 1999) was a Bollywood producer, director, writer, actor who made several hit movies in 1960s, 1970s and 1980s.

Biography
Om Prakash (O. P.) Ralhan was born on 21 August 1928 in Sialkot, British India, current Pakistan, into a prosperous Hindu Arora family. He was 19 years old when the partition of India happened. He and his family were compelled to leave home and hearth and move as refugees to the territory which remained with India. Here, having lost all their capital and business, they were compelled to work at small jobs to earn a living. O.P. happened to find work with film-makers. Around this time, something else happened which drew him closer to the film world. 

Ralhan played small roles in films from early 1950s to the early 1960s. By this time, his brother-in-law had become a very big film star, and he told Ralhan to produce a film starring him. Ralhan managed to get distributors to finance his first film: Gehra Daag (1963), with Rajendra Kumar and Mala Sinha in lead roles. The film was moderately successful, but Ralhan now had a foothold in the industry. Phool aur Phattar, directed by Ralhan himself, with a cast including Meena Kumari, Shashikala and Dharmendra, which went on to make him into a super star.  The film was quite successful in Hindi &  was also made in Tamil, "Oli Vilakku" starring M.G. Ramachandran, Jaya Lalithaa & Sowkar Janaki. However, he is best remembered as the Director (and also its producer) for film: Talash (1969) (Lead actors:  Rajendra Kumar and Sharmila Tagore).  The film was, and perhaps still is, quite enjoyable to watch and had excellent music by composer Sachin Dev Burman. It was the most expensive movie made of its time. Hulchul, was a film without any songs a Comedy suspense thriller. Bandhe Haath a Doppelgänger story starring Mumtaz & Amitabh Bachchan. "Mari Bena" was Mr Ralhan's venture into Regional films starring Reeta Bhaduri, Arvind Kirad, Dina Pathak & Mr O. P Ralhan. Paapi was a multi starrer with an ensemble cast of Sunil Dutt, Sanjiv Kumar, Zeenat Aman, Reena Roy, Prem Chopra, Danny Denzongpa. Pyaas was a film made on Social subject a Tax free film starring Tanuja, Zeenat Aman, Kawaljeet Singh & O.P Ralhan.

Among Ralhan's notable achievements are giving breaks to struggling actors and also introducing new actors in his films. He directed film Mujrim (1958) starring Shammi Kapoor and Ragini. He made Phool Aur Patthar (1966) which became Dharmendra's first golden jubilee hit. Zeenat Aman was first introduced into Bollywood by O. P. Ralhan in his 1971 film Hulchul, although the misconception is that Dev Anand brought her with Hare Rama Hare Krishna. Ralhan also introduced Kabir Bedi in Hulchul. He cast Amitabh Bachchan in Bandhe Haath (1973) at a time when he was not yet a well known name.

O.P Ralhan's wife, Manorama, was the sister of actor Rajendra Kumar. Ralhan had no sons. His grandson Armaan (son of his daughter Rupalli) has taken his grandfathers last name 'Ralhan' to continue the legacy of his grandfather in Bollywood.

Filmography
Mujrim (1958)
Gehra Daag (1963)
Phool Aur Patthar (1966)
Talash (1969)
Hulchul (1971)
Bandhe Hath (1973)
Paapi (1977)
Pyaas (1982)

References

External links 
 
 

Hindi film producers
1928 births
1999 deaths
Hindi-language film directors
Indian film directors